Allen Island or Allen's Island is a  private island which is part of St. George, Knox County, Maine.  it is located near the southeastern end of Muscongus Bay, roughly midway between the southernmost parts of the St. George's mainland, and Monhegan Island.

Description
The island is the largest of a small cluster of islands marking the southeastern extent of Muscongus Bay.  To its northwest is Benner Island, from which it is separated by a relatively narrow channel, and to the east, across a wider channel, is Burnt Island (not to be confused with Burnt Island in Boothbay Harbor, where Burnt Island Light is located).  The geographic features match those described in James Rosier's account of the exploratory expedition of George Waymouth, in which landing and exploration of an island is made.

In 1979, the island was purchased by Betsy Wyeth, wife of painter Andrew Wyeth. The island had lost its full-time residents when it was purchased by Wyeth and had become "a seasonal home for two fishing families living in decaying houses on the fringe of the fast-encroaching spruce forest".

Archaeological site
The island contains archaeologically sensitive prehistoric sites.  It was surveyed by the state in the early 1980s, seeking confirming evidence of Waymouth's expedition landing, and a stratified Contact Period/Middle Woodland site was identified.  The site was listed on the National Register of Historic Places on December 15, 1983.

See also
 List of islands of Maine
 National Register of Historic Places listings in Knox County, Maine

References

External links
 

Private islands of Maine
Islands of Knox County, Maine
Archaeological sites on the National Register of Historic Places in Maine
National Register of Historic Places in Knox County, Maine
Islands of Maine
Coastal islands of Maine